Lenny Lake is a Saint Kitts and Nevis professional football manager.

In 2004 and from October 2008 to August 2010 he coached the Saint Kitts and Nevis national football team.

References

External links
Profile at Soccerway.com
Profile at Soccerpunter.com

Year of birth missing (living people)
Living people
Saint Kitts and Nevis football managers
Saint Kitts and Nevis national football team managers
Place of birth missing (living people)